Daltonganj railway station, station code DTO, is a railway station serving the cities of Medininagar and Palamu in Palamu district of the Indian state of Jharkhand. Daltonganj station is also the headquarters of the Palamu division of the East Central Railway Zone of the Indian Railways. It is also a major station on the CIC route and will be a primary hub on the Ranchi–New Delhi route after the opening of the Ranchi–Tori rail line. Major trains such as the Ranchi Rajdhani Express, Muri Express, Sambalpur–Varanasi Express, Palamu Express, Ranchi–Varanasi Express, Ranchi–Ajmer Garib Nawaz Express, Triveni Express, Ahmedabad Kolkata Express, Jharkhand Swarna Jayanti Express, Jharkhand Sampark Kranti Express, and Shaktipunj Express also stop here.

Daltonganj has trains running frequently to Ranchi, Delhi, Kolkata, Varanasi, and Patna.

History

In 2003, the Dhanbad division was carved out from the existing Dhanbad railway division of the Eastern Railway Zone. The ceilings of the Unreserved Ticketing System (UTS) and the Passenger Reservation System (PRS) are being beautified with scenery. The facade of the Daltonganj station was embellished in February 2012.

Connections

Daltonganj station is located close to a bus terminal and a domestic airport providing transport to important destinations in Jharkhand. The nearest airports to Daltonganj station are:

Birsa Munda Airport, Ranchi – 
Gaya Airport – 
Lok Nayak Jayaprakash Airport, Patna – 
Netaji Subhash Chandra Bose International Airport, Kolkata –

Trains
Several local electric passenger trains also run from Daltonganj to neighbouring destinations at frequent intervals.

See also

 Daltonganj

References

External links

 Official website of Palamau District

Railway stations in Palamu district
Medininagar
Dhanbad railway division